The Swift Current station is a railway station in Swift Current, Saskatchewan, Canada. It was built by the Canadian Pacific Railway, but is now only used by Canadian Pacific train crews. The station comprises the following three buildings:
one story brick building including a passenger waiting room and ticket office (built in 1907 and extended in 1923)
two story brick dining hall and telegraph building  (built between 1908–09 and extended in 1957)
one-storey brick express building (built in 1912)
The building was designated a historic railway station in 1991. The City of Swift Current owns all three buildings, leasing the actual train station to CP while the other two buildings are vacant.

See also
 List of designated heritage railway stations of Canada

References 

Designated Heritage Railway Stations in Saskatchewan
Canadian Pacific Railway stations in Saskatchewan
Railway stations in Canada opened in 1907
Disused railway stations in Canada
Buildings and structures in Swift Current
Transport in Swift Current